Jayanthi Rai  a current Deputy chairman of CPN (Unified Socialist). She is also member of Rastriya Sabha and was elected from 2022 Nepalese National Assembly election.

References 

Communist Party of Nepal (Unified Socialist) politicians
Living people
Year of birth missing (living people)
Members of the National Assembly (Nepal)